Sergey Orlenko (born 10 February 1971) is a Russian volleyball player. He competed in the men's tournament at the 1996 Summer Olympics.

References

External links
 

1971 births
Living people
Russian men's volleyball players
Olympic volleyball players of Russia
Volleyball players at the 1996 Summer Olympics
People from Novokuybyshevsk
Sportspeople from Samara Oblast
20th-century Russian people
21st-century Russian people